The 2018 Missouri Valley Conference men's soccer tournament was the 29th edition of the competition. The tournament was played from November 7 until November 11, 2018.

The Central Arkansas Bears won the tournament, defeating Loyola Chicago 2–1 in the final. The win give the UCA their second consecutive MVC men's soccer championship, and a berth into the 2018 NCAA Division I men's soccer tournament.

Background 

The 2018 Missouri Valley Conference Men's Soccer Tournament is the culmination of the regular season. The regular season conference matches determine the seeding in the tournament, which determines the conference's automatic berth into the NCAA Tournament. All teams in the Missouri Valley Conference, or MVC, play each other once during the season. Teams play certain teams at home during even number years, and then will play those teams on the road during odd number years. Teams are awarded three points for a win, a point for a draw and no points for a loss.

In the event that teams are tied on points, the first tiebreaker is head-to-head record. If that tiebreaker is tied, goal differential is applied, followed by goals scored, then away goals, then RPI.

Central Arkansas won the regular season with a 4–1–1 record.

Seeding

Bracket 

Source:

Results

Quarterfinals

Semifinals

MVC Championship

Statistics

Goalscorers
2 Goals
 Niklas Brodacki - Central Arkansas
 Daltyn Knutson - Central Arkansas
 Aidan Megally - Loyola Chicago
 Stuart Wilkin - Missouri State

1 Goal
 Tyler Curylo - Valparaiso
 Hunter Deweese - Evansville
 Josh Dolling - Missouri State
 Steven Enna - Drake
 Leroy Enzugusi - Drake
 Ryan Harris - Evansville
 Conor Ingram - Missouri State
 Harry Lewis - Missouri State
 Greg Stratton - Missouri State
 Ben Stroud - Missouri State

Honors and awards

MVC All-Tournament team

See also 
 2018 Missouri Valley Conference Women's Soccer Tournament

References

External links 
MVC Men's Soccer Championship Central

2018